In Hinduism, Bhasmasura is an asura or demon, who was granted the power to burn up and immediately turn into ashes (bhasma) anyone whose head he touched with his hand. The asura was tricked by the Vishnu's female avatar, the enchantress Mohini, to turn himself into ashes.

Legend
While Bhasmasura is a character who does not appear in the Puranas, his story is mentioned in regional literature. The asura is stated to have been born of the bhasma dust (ashes) on the body of Shiva or the name simply refers to his ability to turn others to ashes. Pleased at the great devotion of the demon towards him, Shiva agreed to grant a boon of his choice. Bhasmasura sought the power to burn to ashes anybody on whose head he placed his hand. Shiva granted this to him. Bhasmasura became arrogant with the boon, and is stated to have become a nightmare to the whole world. He decided to try it on Shiva. Shiva had to vacate Kailasa and ask Vishnu for help. Vishnu assumed the form of the ravishing Mohini, an attractive dancer, who allured him with her charm, and initiated a dance called the Muktanṛtya. During the course of this dance, Bhasmasura was forced to place his hand on his own head. The moment his hand touched his head, he was burnt to ashes.

Dance

Based on the popular story, the dancers take different postures leading to them ultimately revolving both their hands on their heads.  The dancer enacting Bhasmasura is placed at the end of row and he is the last dancer to revolve his hands over his head.  

The Bhasmasura-type pose--with one hand atop the head and the other behind the back--is also common in women's dancing in the Bhojpuri region and, by extension, in Indo-Caribbean society, where it is a typical feature of chutney dancing.  A few Indo-Caribbeans claim that this pose relates to the Bhasmasura myth.

Other versions
In Ramakien, the Thai version of the Ramayana, Bhasmasura is combined with Ravana (Thotsakan in Ramakien).

In popular culture
 The 1966 Kannada movie Mohini Bhasmasura was based on this legend.

References

External links
 The Tale of Chaortan, Crutath and Brartvor

Asura